Eugene E. "Gene" Damschroder (January 14, 1922 – June 8, 2008) was an American politician and aviator. He was member of the Ohio House of Representatives from 1973 to 1983. He was a member of the Republican Party.

Damschroder flew seaplanes for the U.S. Navy during World War II.

Damschroder was elected to the Ohio House of Representatives in 1972, representing Fremont in the 85th District from 1973 to 1983.

Damschroder tried to regain his seat, now the 81st District, in Republican primary elections in 2002 and 2008.

On June 8, 2008, Damschroder was killed when the single engine Cessna aircraft he was flying crashed with five other persons on board.

References 

1922 births
2008 deaths
Aviators killed in aviation accidents or incidents in the United States
Republican Party members of the Ohio House of Representatives
People from Sandusky County, Ohio
Accidental deaths in Ohio
United States Navy pilots of World War II
20th-century American politicians
Victims of aviation accidents or incidents in 2008